Suðurnesjabær ("Southern Peninsula town") is a municipality in Iceland that was created on 10 June 2018 from the merger of Sandgerði and Garður municipalities. The name Suðurnesjabær was chosen by its residents in November 2018 which was the most popular option.

References

Municipalities of Iceland
Populated places established in 2018
2018 establishments in Iceland